Luis Daniel Chiquillo Ledesma (born 2 January 1999) is a Venezuelan footballer who plays as a midfielder for Monagas.

Career statistics

Club

Notes

References

1999 births
Living people
Venezuelan footballers
Association football midfielders
Venezuelan Primera División players
Monagas S.C. players
Venezuela under-20 international footballers
21st-century Venezuelan people